Eresiomera bicolor, the western pearly, is a butterfly in the family Lycaenidae. It is found in Sierra Leone, Liberia, Ivory Coast, Ghana, Togo and Nigeria. The habitat consists of forests.

Adults feed on flower nectar from extrafloral nectaries.

References

Butterflies described in 1890
Poritiinae
Butterflies of Africa